Marie-Renée Lavoie (born February 21, 1974 in Quebec City) is a Canadian writer from Quebec. She is most noted for her 2010 novel La petite et le vieux, which won the 2012 edition of Le Combat des livres.

Mister Roger and Me, an English translation of La petite et le vieux by Wayne Grady, was published in 2012.

Her second novel, Autopsie d'une femme plate, was published in 2017, and the English translation Autopsy of a Boring Wife followed in 2019. A sequel novel, Diane demande un recomptage, was published in 2020, with the English translation A Boring Wife Settles the Score released in 2021.

Some Maintenance Required, an English translation of her 2018 novel Les chars meurent aussi, is slated for publication in 2022.

References

1974 births
Living people
21st-century Canadian novelists
21st-century Canadian women writers
Canadian women novelists
Canadian novelists in French
Writers from Quebec City
French Quebecers